XHEPA-FM/XEPA-AM is a radio station on 89.7 FM and 1010 AM in Puebla, Puebla, Mexico. It carries the La Ke Buena regional Mexican format from Radiópolis. 1010 AM is a Canadian clear-channel frequency.

History

XEPA-AM 1010 received its concession on October 9, 1958. Salvador Martínez Aguirre owned the station, which signed on 16 days later on 1370 kHz with 5,000 watts of power during the day and 250 at night. Martínez Aguirre had entered into a partnership with Veracruz radio giant Carlos Ferráez Matos, and the station's inauguration was headlined by Governor Fausto M. Ortega. Given the difficulty of sending audio by phone line to the transmitter at San José Xilotzingo, XEPA was authorized to use an FM studio-transmitter link at 88.2 MHz. In 1960, Ferráez's participation in the station ended. The station's early years as "Radio Angelópolis", a station with a full-service format, included key moments, such as being a coordinating station for the 1964 presidential campaign of Gustavo Díaz Ordaz and leading efforts to aid earthquake victims in 1972. In 1974, XEPA became known as "Su Favorita" and began distinctly targeting a rural audience. Most of its listeners were from outside the Puebla metropolitan area. The next year, the station flipped to pop as "Sonido 13-70", but upon consolidating with Radio Oro in 1976, in order to not compete with its FM-formatted pop stations, XEPA took on a ranchera format and became known as "La Poblanita", which rated well in the market.

After Martínez Aguirre died, Margarita Duarte Calderón, Salvador Joaquín Martínez Duarte, Georgina Martínez de Cabrera, Alicia Martínez de Ortega and Raúl Antonio Martínez Gardiazabal became the concessionaires in 1977. That year, their studios moved in with XHORO-FM "Radio Oro", but in 1983, they moved out after striking a partnership with XHPBA-FM "Sí FM" for studio space. In 1987, XEPA flipped to tropical as "La Grande"; La Grande and its successor format, "La Súper Fiera" with ranchera and grupera music, held XEPA in the top 10 of the local radio ratings.

In the 1990s, XEPA moved to 1010 kHz and built a new transmitter site in Santa María Coronango, capable of delivering 10,000 watts and stereo sound. By 1998, XEPA had changed again, to La Prendida, with a similar format. In 2000, XEPA went to Ke Buena for the first time.

Power was doubled in 2005, a year after the station relaunched as "La Diez" (The 10) with a hybrid of locally targeted news and talk programs, as well as music on the weekends. The concessionaires who had inherited XEPA in the 1970s were now dying. In 2008, José Asef Hanan Badri acquired the ownership stakes of the three remaining living concessionaires, while Arely del Rocío Martínez Rojas inherited Martínez Duarte's share and later sold to Hanan Badri in 2012.

XEPA would later return to the Ke Buena format. The station began its AM-FM migration in early 2018 as XHEPA-FM 89.7.

References

1958 establishments in Mexico
Mass media in Puebla (city)
Radio stations established in 1958
Radio stations in Mexico with continuity obligations
Radio stations in Puebla
Regional Mexican radio stations
Spanish-language radio stations